Orrella is a genus of bacteria from the family of Alcaligenaceae with one known species (Orrella dioscoreae).

References

 

Burkholderiales
Bacteria genera
Monotypic bacteria genera